Norman T. Christie (24 November 1913 – after 1936) was an English footballer who played for Bishop Auckland, Huddersfield Town and Blackburn Rovers.

He was a centre-half (central defender). He used to tell how he once jumped up with the opposing centre-forward to head the ball; he jumped with his mouth open, and came down with a mouthful of the forward's skin from the back of his neck.

References

1913 births
Year of death missing
Sportspeople from Jarrow
Footballers from Tyne and Wear
English footballers
Association football defenders
Bishop Auckland F.C. players
Huddersfield Town A.F.C. players
Blackburn Rovers F.C. players
English Football League players